USS Sacagawea (YT/YTM-326) was built in 1925, and acquired by the United States Navy from Brazil in 1942 as Almirante Noronha. She is one of the few US Naval vessels named for a woman. Sacagawea was a guide for the Lewis and Clark Expedition.

Service history
She was renamed Sacagawea on 1 September 1942 and was placed in service as a harbor tug at Charleston, South Carolina, upon her delivery on 30 September.

Reclassified YTM-326 on 15 May 1944, she served at Charleston until she was placed out of service and struck from the Navy list on 22 June 1945. Sacagawea was then turned over to the State Department for disposal and was sold to foreign purchasers in May 1946.

References

1925 ships
Tugs of the United States Navy
USS Sacagawea (YT-326)